The 2011 Duhok riots refers to riots which began on December 2, 2011 in the Duhok Governorate, Iraq. They were instigated by Friday prayers' sermons by Ismail Osman Sindai, a Kurdish imam, calling for attacks against stores selling alcohol and massage parlours in Zakho. The riots soon developed into the looting and burning down of Assyrian- and Yazidi-owned properties in other towns in the governorate, causing four million dollars of damage.

The riots ended after Kurdistan Regional Government security forces intervened and began a massive crackdown on demonstrators. As a result of the riots, a group of secular Kurds attacked a number of buildings belonging to the Kurdistan Islamic Union party.

Background
Assyrian personalities in the region had been wary of the changes of the Arab Spring, particularity the rise of radical Islamism.
The riots started in Zakho, the northernmost town of Iraq, located close to the Turkish border. The town has a majority Kurdish population with a sizeable Assyrian and Yazidi minority.

Friday events 
The small riots were instigated by Friday sermons in the northern city of Zakho after Muslim clerics called for the destruction of stores that sold alcohol in the city on December 2, 2011. Angry youth mobs attacked Assyrian- and Yazidi-owned businesses such as stores, hotels, casinos, and massage parlors in the northern town of Zakho.
The violence spilled into nearby towns of Duhok and Semel. Many Assyrian social clubs and homes were also attacked throughout the province. Angry Kurdish pro-government supporters that belonged to the Patriotic Union of Kurdistan and Kurdistan Democratic Party suspected Muslim Brotherhood-inspired Kurdistan Islamic Union (KIU) clerics to be behind the violence and attacked offices of the Islamic party in Duhok and Erbil overnight. However, in an official statement, the KIU denied any connections to the riots.

The riots ended three days later with the strong response from the Kurdistan Regional Government.

Targets
Riots began in Zakho but quickly expanded to Semel, Duhok and surrounding Assyrian villages.

December 2 Targets:
30 stores that sold alcohol, 4 hotels, 1 massage parlor, a number of hair salons, cafeterias, and a Catholic diocese in Zakho.
The Assyrian Nohadra Social Club in Duhok was attacked by a mob of 200 people, causing damage worth 50,000 dollars
The Yazidi Health Club in Duhok
The Wan Restaurant in Semel
A bar and a tourist hotel in Zawita that led to the arrest of 32 people.
December 3 Targets:
A group of 100 local Islamists attacked the Assyrian Saint Daniel Church and many Christian homes in Mansouriyah early in the morning. Locals claim young students were instigated by teachers.
Homes in the village of Sheoz

December 4 Targets
Three shops that sold alcohol were set on fire by a mob of 20 in the Assyrian village of Deralok
A store that sold alcohol was shot with an automatic weapon in Duhok

December 5 Targets
Shops that sold alcohol were burned down by mobs in Koy Sanjaq
Massage parlor burned in Sulaymaniyah
Previously burned shops in Zakho were pasted with flyers threatening to burn down any shop that decides to reopen

Aftermath
On December 3, the Kurdish intelligence agency Asaish arrested 20 KIU members of parliament and high officials within the party.
The President of Iraqi Kurdistan Masoud Barzani ordered the formation of a committee to investigate the event. In an official press release, he stated: "I condemn both these unlawful acts. I call on the people of the Kurdistan Region to preserve our traditions of ethnic and religious co-existence. I have ordered the formation of a committee to look into these disturbances and bring to justice those responsible."

References

External links 
Video of the Riots — Burning and destruction of places selling drinks and massage
Video of the Riots 2 — Clashes between youths and security forces in Zakho
Video of the Riots 3 — Zakho after demonstrations and vandalism

Protests in Iraq
2011 in Iraqi Kurdistan
Duhok
Zakho
2011 riots
2011 in Iraq
Iraqi insurgency (2011–2013)
Persecution of Yazidis in Iraq
Persecution of Assyrians in Iraq